Sigma-t is a quantity used in oceanography to measure the density of seawater at a given temperature. σT is defined as ρ(S,T)-1000 kg m−3, where ρ(S,T) is the density of a sample of seawater at temperature T and salinity S, measured in kg m−3, at standard atmospheric pressure. For example, a water sample with a density of 1.027 g/cm3 has a σT value of 27.

References

See also
Density of saltwater and ice

Units of density